Notaris is a surname. It may refer to:

 Carlo De Notaris (1812-1888), Italian painter
 Giuseppe De Notaris (1805–1877), Italian botanist and mycologist
 Sotirios Notaris (fencer) (1879–1924), Greek fencer and Olympic competitor
 Sotirios Notaris (wrestler) (1896–1971), Greek wrestler and Olympic competitor

See also
 Notari, a disambiguation page
 Notaris (beetle), a genus of weevil